Viktor Karachun (12 August 1968 – 11 August 2004) was a Belarusian ice hockey player. He competed in the men's tournament at the 1998 Winter Olympics.

Career statistics

Regular season and playoffs

International

References

External links
 

1968 births
2004 deaths
Soviet ice hockey centres
Olympic ice hockey players of Belarus
Ice hockey players at the 1998 Winter Olympics
Ice hockey people from Minsk
HC Dinamo Minsk players
Stoczniowiec Gdańsk players
Podhale Nowy Targ players
Belarusian ice hockey centres
Augsburger Panther players
Belarusian expatriate sportspeople in Poland
Belarusian expatriate sportspeople in Germany
Deaths from cancer in Germany
Belarusian expatriate ice hockey people
Expatriate ice hockey players in Germany
Expatriate ice hockey players in Poland
Heilbronner EC players
SC Bietigheim-Bissingen players
Revier Löwen players
EHC Neuwied players